The Western and Central Pacific Fisheries Commission (WCPFC) is both a general and a tuna regional fisheries management organisation established to conserve and manage tuna and other highly migratory fish stocks across the western and central areas of the Pacific Ocean. Its full name is Commission for the Conservation and Management of Highly Migratory Fish Stocks in the Western and Central Pacific Ocean. It  commenced operations in late 2005, and its secretariat is based in Pohnpei, in the northern Pacific state of the Federated States of Micronesia.

The WCPF Convention is the second regional fisheries management agreement negotiated since the conclusion of the 1995 U.N. Fish Stocks Agreement.

Operation
The WCPF Convention was based on the 1995 UN Fish Stocks Agreement, and addressed the specific characteristics of the western and central Pacific Ocean. It established a framework for the participation of fishing entities  legally binding them to its provisions. Territories and possessions can participate in the work of the Commission, which also cooperates with fisheries in other regions whose competence overlaps with WCPFC. Cooperation with the Inter-American Tropical Tuna Commission is of particular importance because of the overlap in respective Convention Areas and the wide range of some of the stocks (such as Bigeye tuna, and the two Albacore Tuna stocks) jointly managed by WCPFC and IATTC. The High Seas of the WCPFC Convention Area also overlaps with the South Pacific Regional Fisheries Management Organisation and the new North Pacific Fisheries Commission Convention Area. However the fish stocks managed by these RFMOs are different from those managed by WCPFC, and interactions are likely to be restricted to those involving bycatch and multipurpose vessels.

The WCPFC Secretariat maintains Register of Fishing Vessels authorized by their flag States to fish for tuna and other relevant highly migratory fish stocks in the WCPFC Convention Area, manages a Vessel Monitoring System, maintains standards for the national and subregional observer programs that make up the Regional Observer Program, and convenes meetings of the Commission. Primary scientific services are provided under contract by the Oceanic Fisheries Programme of the Pacific Community (SPC), and one of the WCPFC subsidiary bodies - the Northern Committee - also obtains scientific advice from The International Scientific Committee for Tuna and Tuna-Like Species in the North Pacific Ocean (ISC).

Governance
The current Chair of the Commission is Rhea Moss-Christian was elected to the position in December 2014. She succeeds Charles Karnella of the USA. Satya Nandan from Fiji, who was also the first Secretary-General of the International Seabed Authority, was the previous Chair, and the first Chair of the WCPFC was Glenn Hurry, a former CEO of the Australian Fisheries Management Authority. The secretariat for the commission is located in Kolonia, Pohnpei, Federated States of Micronesia in a building funded by the Chinese government. The Commission held its twelfth regular session in December 2015, in Bali, Indonesia.

In December 2014 at the 11th regular session of the WCPFC in Apia, Samoa, Feleti Teo was appointed the Executive Director of the Commission. Teo previously served as Attorney General of Tuvalu, Director General of the Forum Fishery Agency, Deputy Secretary General of the Pacific Islands Forum and in 2008 he had been the acting Secretary General of the Pacific Islands Forum.

Decisions of the Commission are normally made by consensus, but the WCPFC Convention also provides for a two-chambered voting mechanism, with member countries of the Pacific Islands Forum Fisheries Agency (FFA) forming one chamber.

The Commission has three formal subsidiary bodies: the Scientific Committee (SC), which usually meets in early August; the Northern Committee (NC), which usually meets in early September; and t he Technical and Compliance Committee (TCC), which usually meets in late September.

Membership
Membership of the Commission is open to the States that participated in negotiating the 2004 Convention.  The contracting parties to the Convention, by consensus, may invite States or regional economic integration organizations that wish to fish for highly migratory fish stocks in the western and central Pacific to accede to the Convention. This approach restricts access, emphasizing that the initiative to accede lies with existing parties, not with new applicants.

Members

 Australia
 China
 Canada
 Cook Islands
 European Union
 Federated States of Micronesia
 Fiji
 France
 Indonesia
 Japan
 Kiribati
 South Korea
 Marshall Islands
 Nauru
 New Zealand
 Niue
 Palau
 Papua New Guinea
 Philippines
 Samoa
 Solomon Islands
 Taiwan
 Tonga
 Tuvalu
 United States
 Vanuatu 

Participating territories

 American Samoa
 Northern Mariana Islands
 French Polynesia
 Guam
 New Caledonia
 Tokelau
 Wallis & Futuna 

Cooperating non-members

 The Bahamas
 Curacao
 Ecuador
 El Salvador
 Nicaragua
 Liberia
 Panama
 Thailand
 Vietnam

Performance of the Commission
The status of stocks under the oversight of the Commission is informally summarized in the ISSF Status of Stocks Report.

Controversy
In June 2015 the fisheries ministers of the countries that are parties to the Nauru Agreement met in Palikir, Pohnpei, under the chairmanship of Elisala Pita of Tuvalu, who stated that in 2015 Tuvalu has refused to sell fishing days to certain nations and fleets that have blocked Tuvaluan initiatives to develop and sustain their own fishery. Elisala Pita also said that Tuvalu was disappointed with the outcomes of recent meetings of the WCPFC as some fishing nations had tried to avoid their responsibilities and commitment to sustainable fishing.

See also
North Pacific Fisheries Commission
Pacific Community
 Pacific Islands Forum Fisheries Agency
 Inter-American Tropical Tuna Commission

References

External links
 Western and Central Pacific Fisheries Commission – Official web site
 Mahon, R and McConney, PA (2004) Management of large pelagic fisheries in CARICOM Countries FAO Fisheries Technical Paper 464.

Fisheries agencies
Fisheries conservation organizations
Intergovernmental organizations established by treaty
Pacific Ocean
Organizations based in the Federated States of Micronesia
Organizations established in 2005
2005 establishments in Oceania